Termiticola is a fungal genus in the family Agaricaceae. It is a monotypic genus, containing the single species Termiticola rubescens, found in Papua New Guinea.

See also
 List of Agaricaceae genera
 List of Agaricales genera

References

Agaricaceae
Fungi of New Guinea
Monotypic Agaricales genera